Saint-Maudez is a commune in the Côtes-d'Armor department of Brittany in northwestern France. It is named after the Breton Saint Maudez.

History
St. Maudez is the tenth son of the King of Ireland Erelus (or Erelea or Ardea) and Gentuse or Getive, his wife. Saint-Maudez landed in Brittany, around 528, not far from Dol, with his sister Saint Juvette and two disciples, Saint Botmel and Saint Tudy.

Heraldic 
Blazon = Carved: 1st of silver sown with shadows of ermine speckles with a line of azure, a lion gules crowned with gold debruising, 2nd of azure sown shadows of ermine speckles and at Saint Maudet bypassed halo issuant from the point and holding his episcopal crozier, all in shadow with the silver line.

Population

Inhabitants of Saint-Maudez are called maudéziens in French.

Places and monuments

 The church Saint-Maudez, the millennial yew, its parish enclosure and the cross of the Templar Knights (registered in the inventory of historical monuments on 28/10/1926 under the reference PA000896446)
 The Orrhins Crosses (see below)
 The Gouyon fountain 
 The Thaumatz Castle  (private)
 Many old remarkable houses

See also
 Communes of the Côtes-d'Armor department

References

External links

 
 Saint Maudez on the French National Institute of Geography
 Saint Maudez on the French National Library website
 Saint Maudez - BNF

Communes of Côtes-d'Armor
Côtes-d'Armor communes articles needing translation from French Wikipedia